Frederick, Prince of Wales  (Frederick Louis, ; 31 January 170731 March 1751) was the eldest son and heir apparent of King George II of Great Britain. He grew estranged from his parents, King George and Queen Caroline. Frederick was the father of King George III.

Under the Act of Settlement passed by the English Parliament in 1701, Frederick was fourth in the line of succession to the British throne at birth, after his great-grandmother Sophia, Dowager Electress of Hanover; his grandfather George, Elector of Hanover; and his father, George, Electoral Prince of Hanover. The Elector ascended the British throne in 1714. After his grandfather died and his father became king in 1727, Frederick moved to Great Britain and was created Prince of Wales in 1729. He predeceased his father, however, and upon the latter's death in 1760, the throne passed to Frederick's eldest son, George III.

Early life

The Elector was also one of Frederick's two godfathers, as well as the son of Sophia of Hanover, granddaughter of James VI and I and first cousin once removed and heir presumptive to Queen Anne of Great Britain. However, Sophia died before Anne, in June 1714 when aged 83, which elevated the Elector to heir-presumptive; Queen Anne died on 1 August the same year, and Sophia's son became King George I. This made Frederick's father first-in-line to the British throne and Frederick himself second-in-line. Frederick's other godfather was his grand-uncle Frederick I, King in Prussia and Elector of Brandenburg-Prussia. Frederick was nicknamed "Griff" within the family.

In the year of Anne's death and the coronation of George I, Frederick's parents, George, Prince of Wales (later George II), and Caroline of Ansbach, were called upon to leave Hanover for Great Britain when Frederick was only seven years old. He was left in the care of his grand-uncle Ernest Augustus, Prince-Bishop of Osnabrück, and did not see his parents again for 14 years.

In 1722, Frederick was inoculated against smallpox by Charles Maitland on the instructions of his mother, Caroline. His grandfather George I created him Duke of Edinburgh, Marquess of the Isle of Ely, Earl of Eltham in the county of Kent, Viscount of Launceston in the county of Cornwall, and Baron of Snaudon in the county of Carnarvon, on 26 July 1726. The latter two titles have been interpreted differently since: the ofs are omitted and Snaudon rendered as Snowdon.

Frederick arrived in Great Britain in 1728, the year after his father had become King George II. By then, George and Caroline had had several younger children, and Frederick, himself now Prince of Wales, was a high-spirited young man fond of drinking, gambling and women. The long separation had damaged the relationship with his parents, and they would never be close to him. 1728 also saw the foundation of Fredericksburg, Virginia, which was named after himhis other namesakes are Prince Frederick, Maryland (1722), Fort Frederick, Maine (1729–30), Fort Frederick, South Carolina (1730–34), Fort Frederick, New York (completed 1735), and Fort Frederica, Georgia (founded 1736); while Fort Frederick, Maryland, Point Frederick, Ontario, Fort Frederick, Ontario and Fort Frederick, New Brunswick were also named after him posthumously.

Prince of Wales

The motives for the ill-feeling between Frederick and his parents may have included the fact that he had been set up by his grandfather, even as a small child, as the representative of the House of Hanover, and was used to presiding over official occasions in the absence of his parents. He was not permitted to go to Great Britain until after his father took the throne as George II on 11 June 1727. Frederick had continued to be known as Prince Friedrich Ludwig of Hanover (with his British HRH style) even after his father had been created Prince of Wales.

Frederick was created Prince of Wales on 7 January 1728. He served as the tenth Chancellor of the University of Dublin from 1728 to 1751, and a portrait of him still enjoys a commanding position in the Hall of Trinity College Dublin.

Once, established in London, Frederick sponsored a court of 'opposition' politicians. They supported the Opera of the Nobility in Lincoln's Inn Fields as a rival to George Frideric Handel's royally sponsored opera at the King's Theatre in the Haymarket. Frederick was a lover of music who played the viola and cello; he is depicted playing a cello in three portraits by Philippe Mercier of Frederick and his sisters. He enjoyed the natural sciences and the arts, and became a thorn in the side of his parents, making a point of opposing them in everything, according to the court gossip Lord Hervey. At court, the favourite of George II and Queen Caroline was Frederick's younger brother, Prince William, Duke of Cumberland, to the extent that the king looked into ways of splitting his domains so that Frederick would succeed only in Britain, while Hanover would go to William.

Hervey and Frederick (using a pseudonym "Captain Bodkin") wrote a theatrical comedy which was staged at the Drury Lane Theatre in October 1731. It was panned by the critics, and even the theatre's manager thought it so bad that it was unlikely to play out even the first night. He had soldiers stationed in the audience to maintain order, and when the play flopped, the audience were given their money back. Hervey and Frederick also shared a mistress, Anne Vane, who had a son called FitzFrederick Vane in June 1732. Either of them or William Stanhope, 1st Earl of Harrington, another of her lovers, could have been the father. Jealousy between Frederick and Hervey may have contributed to a breach, and their friendship ended. Hervey later wrote bitterly that Frederick was "false ... never having the least hesitation in telling any lie that served his present purpose."

Patron of the arts
A permanent result of Frederick's patronage of the arts is "Rule, Britannia!", one of the best-known British patriotic songs. It was composed by the English composer Thomas Arne with words written by the Scottish poet and playwright James Thomson as part of the masque Alfred, which was first performed on 1 August 1740 at Cliveden. Thomas Arne was also one of Frederick's favourite artists. A masque linking the prince with both the Saxon hero-king Alfred the Great's victories over the Vikings and with the contemporary issue of building up British sea power accorded well with Frederick's political plans and aspirations. Later, the song gained a life of its own outside of the masque. Thomson, who supported the Prince of Wales politically, also dedicated an earlier work dedicated to him: Liberty (1734). 

Unlike the king, Frederick was a knowledgeable amateur of painting, patronising immigrant artists such as Jacopo Amigoni and Jean-Baptiste van Loo, who painted the portraits of the prince and his consort for Frederick's champion William Pulteney, 1st Earl of Bath. The list of other artists whom he employed—Philippe Mercier, John Wootton, George Knapton and the engraver Joseph Goupy—represents some of the principal painters of the English Rococo. The prince was also crucially important for furthering the popularity of the Roccoco style in the decorative arts, with a clear predilection for French Huguenot craftsmen, patronising silversmiths such as Nicolas Sprimont (1713–1771), toyshop owners like Paul Bertrand, together with carvers and gilders, the most notable being Paul Petit (1729–c. 1756) who first worked for the prince on William Kent's neo-Palladian state barge of 1732, which is still preserved in the National Maritime Museum. Petit worked on a handful of magnificent trophy frames in the Roccoco style for Frederick which are among the most significant remaining testaments to the prince's patronage of the decorative arts. One frame made in 1748 for his namesake cousin Frederick the Great of Prussia, was especially lavish and represented the esteem in which the prince held his cousin, suggesting the prince identified with Frederick the Great's style of enlightened rule, over that of his own father George II. Petit's frame contained a portrait of Frederick the Great painted by Antoine Pense, and remains today in the British Royal Collection.

None of Frederick's homes are now left standing except for the country residence of Cliveden, which is in a much altered state. His London houses of Norfolk House, Carlton House, Leicester House and Kew House or the White House have all been demolished.

Domestic life
Negotiations between George II and his first cousin and brother-in-law Frederick William I of Prussia on a proposed marriage between the Prince of Wales and Frederick William's daughter Wilhelmine were welcomed by Frederick even though the couple had never met. George II was not keen on the proposal but continued talks for diplomatic reasons. Frustrated by the delay, Frederick sent an envoy of his own to the Prussian court. When George II discovered the plan, he immediately arranged for Frederick to leave Hanover for England. The marriage negotiations foundered when Frederick William demanded that Frederick be made Regent in Hanover.

Frederick also almost married Lady Diana Spencer, daughter of Charles Spencer, 3rd Earl of Sunderland and Lady Anne Churchill. Lady Diana was the favourite grandchild of the powerful Sarah, Duchess of Marlborough. The duchess sought a royal alliance by marrying Lady Diana to the Prince of Wales with a massive dowry of £100,000. The prince, who was in great debt, agreed to the proposal, but the plan was vetoed by Robert Walpole and the king. Lady Diana soon married John Russell, 4th Duke of Bedford.

Although in his youth he was a spendthrift and womaniser, Frederick settled down following his marriage to the sixteen-year-old Augusta of Saxe-Gotha on 27 April 1736. The wedding was held at the Chapel Royal at St James's Palace, presided over by Edmund Gibson, Bishop of London and Dean of the Chapel Royal. Handel provided the new anthem 'Sing unto God' for the service, and the wedding was also marked in London by two rival operas, Handel's Atalanta and Porpora's La festa d'Imeneo

In May 1736, George II returned to Hanover, which resulted in unpopularity in England; a satirical notice was even pinned to the gates of St James's Palace decrying his absence. "Lost or strayed out of this house", it read, "a man who has left a wife and six children on the parish." The King made plans to return, in the face of inclement weather; when his ship was caught in a storm, gossip swept London that he had drowned. Eventually, in January 1737, he arrived back in England. Immediately he fell ill, with piles and a fever, and withdrew to his bed. The Prince of Wales put it about that the King was dying, with the result that George insisted on getting up and attending a social event to disprove the gossip-mongers.

Quickly accumulating large debts, Frederick relied for an income on his wealthy friend George Bubb Dodington. The prince's father refused to make him a financial allowance of the size that the prince considered should have been his. Frederick's public opposition to his father's government continued; he opposed the unpopular Gin Act 1736, which tried to control the Gin Craze. Frederick applied to Parliament for an increased financial allowance, and public disagreement over the payment of the money drove a further wedge between parents and son. Frederick's allowance was raised, but by less than he had asked for.

In June 1737, Frederick informed his parents that Augusta was pregnant, and was due to give birth in October. In fact, Augusta's due date was earlier and in July the Prince, on discovering that his wife had gone into labour, sneaked her out of Hampton Court Palace in the middle of the night, to ensure that the King and Queen could not be present at the birth. George and Caroline were horrified. Traditionally, royal births were witnessed by members of the family and senior courtiers to guard against supposititious children, and Augusta had been forced by her husband to ride in a rattling carriage while heavily pregnant and in pain. With a party including two of her daughters and Lord Hervey, the Queen raced over to St James's Palace, where Frederick had taken Augusta. Caroline was relieved to discover that Augusta had given birth to a "poor, ugly little she-mouse" rather than a "large, fat, healthy boy" which made a supposititious child unlikely, since the baby was so pitiful. The circumstances of the birth deepened the estrangement between mother and son.

Frederick was banished from the king's court, and a rival court grew up at Frederick's new residence, Leicester House, where his father and mother had themselves lived after becoming estranged from George I. His mother fell fatally ill at the end of the year, but the king refused Frederick permission to see her. Frederick became a devoted family man, taking his wife and children to live in the countryside at Cliveden, where he fished, shot and rowed. In 1742, Robert Walpole left office and the realignment of the government led to a reconciliation between father and son, as Frederick's friends gained influence.

After the Jacobite Rising of 1745, Frederick met Flora MacDonald, who had been imprisoned in the Tower of London for aiding the escape of the Rising's leader Charles Edward Stuart, and helped to secure her eventual release. In 1747, Frederick rejoined the political opposition, and the king responded by dissolving Parliament. In the subsequent early general election, Frederick's allies lost.

Cricket

By the time Frederick arrived in Great Britain, cricket had developed into the country's most popular team sport, and it thrived on gambling. Perhaps because he wished to anglicise and so fit in with  society, Frederick developed an academic interest in cricket and soon became a genuine enthusiast. He began to make wagers and then to patronise and play the sport, even forming his own team on several occasions.

The earliest mention of Frederick in cricket annals is in a contemporary report of a match on 28 September 1731 between Surrey and London, played on Kennington Common. No post-match report was found despite advance promotion as "likely to be the best performance of this kind that has been seen for some time". The records show that "for the convenience of the gamesters, the ground is to be staked and roped out" – a new practice in 1731 and possibly done partly for the benefit of a royal visitor. The advertisement refers to "the whole county of Surrey" as London's opponents and states that the Prince of Wales is "expected to attend".

In August 1732, the Whitehall Evening Post reported that Frederick attended "a great cricket match" at Kew on 27 July.

By the 1733 season, Frederick was seriously involved in the game, in effect as a county cricketer for Surrey. He was said to have given a guinea to each player in a Surrey vs. Middlesex game at Moulsey Hurst. Then he awarded a silver cup to a combined Surrey and Middlesex team which had just beaten Kent, arguably the best county team at the time, at Moulsey Hurst on 1 August. This is the first reference in cricket history to any kind of trophy (other than hard cash) being contested. On 31 August, the Prince of Wales XI played Sir William Gage's XI on Moulsey Hurst. The result is unknown but the teams were said to be of county standard, so presumably it was in effect a Surrey vs. Sussex match.

In the years following 1733, there are frequent references to the Prince of Wales as a patron of cricket and as an occasional player.

When he died on 31 March 1751, cricket suffered a double blow as his death closely followed that of Charles Lennox, 2nd Duke of Richmond, the game's greatest financial patron at the time. The number of top-class matches declined for several years.

Death

His political ambitions unfulfilled, Frederick died at Leicester House at the age of 44 on 31 March 1751 (20 March OS).  In the past this has been attributed to a burst lung abscess caused by a blow from a cricket or a real tennis ball, but it is now thought to have been from a pulmonary embolism. He was buried at Westminster Abbey on 13 April 1751. He is the most recent Prince of Wales not to have acceded to the British throne.

The Prince of Wales's epigram (quoted by William Makepeace Thackeray, "Four Georges"):
  "Here lies poor Fred who was alive and is dead,
  Had it been his father I had much rather,
  Had it been his sister nobody would have missed her,
  Had it been his brother, still better than another,
  Had it been the whole generation, so much better for the nation,
  But since it is Fred who was alive and is dead,
  There is no more to be said!"

Titles, honours and arms

British titles
He was given the title Duke of Gloucester on 10 January 1717, but when he was raised to the peerage on 26 July 1726 it was as Duke of Edinburgh. He became Duke of Cornwall on 11 June 1727 and  Prince of Wales on 7 January 1729.

Honours
 3 July 1717: Royal Knight of the Garter

Arms
Between his creation as Duke of Edinburgh in 1726 and his creation as Prince of Wales, he bore the arms of the kingdom, differentiated by a label argent of three points, the centre point bearing a cross gules. As Prince of Wales, the difference changed to simply a label argent of three points. Frederick never succeeded his father as Treasurer of the Holy Roman Empire and so the red escutcheon in the centre of his Hanover quarter is empty.

Family

Ancestors

Issue

References

Notes

Bibliography
 Michael De-la-Noy, The King Who Never Was: The Story of Frederick, Prince of Wales, London; Chester Springs, PA: Peter Owen, 1996.
 Van der Kiste, John (1997) George II and Queen Caroline. Stroud, Gloucestershire: Sutton Publishing. 
 John Walters, The Royal Griffin: Frederick, Prince of Wales, 1707–51, London: Jarrolds, 1972.

External links

 Frederick Louis, Prince of Wales at the official website of the Royal Collection Trust
 Frederick Lewis, Prince of Wales at the National Portrait Gallery, London

|-

|-

 
1707 births
1751 deaths
18th-century German dramatists and playwrights
18th-century British dramatists and playwrights
British patrons of the arts
Burials at Westminster Abbey
Chancellors of the University of Dublin
Cricket patrons
Dukes of Cornwall
Dukes of Edinburgh
Dukes of Rothesay
Peers of Great Britain created by George I
English cricketers of 1701 to 1786
English cricketers
Heirs apparent who never acceded
Heirs to the British throne
House of Hanover
Knights of the Garter
Members of the Privy Council of Great Britain
Nobility from Hanover
Princes of Wales
Royal Botanic Gardens, Kew
Freemasons of the Premier Grand Lodge of England
High Stewards of Scotland
18th-century philanthropists
British princes
Children of George II of Great Britain